Najibe Salami (born 7 July 1985), also called Marco which is the Italian version of the Arabic Najibe, is an Italian male long-distance runner, who won five Italian championships.

Biography
Born in Italy from father Moroccan and mother of Gibraltar, he obtained Italian citizenship only in 2004 when he was already of age.

National titles
 Italian Athletics Championships
 5000 m: 2017
 10 km road: 2018
 Italian Athletics Indoor Championships
 1500 m: 2011, 2013
 3000 m: 2007

See also
 Naturalized athletes of Italy

References

External links
 

1985 births
Living people
Italian male cross country runners
Italian male long-distance runners
Italian people of Moroccan descent
Italian sportspeople of African descent
Naturalised citizens of Italy
Athletics competitors of Gruppo Sportivo Esercito